The Canton of Bruay-la-Buissière is one of the 39 cantons of the Pas-de-Calais department, in northern France. At the French canton reorganisation which came into effect in March 2015, the canton was expanded from 1 to 12 communes.

It consists of the following communes: 

Bajus
Beugin
Bruay-la-Buissière
Caucourt
La Comté
Estrée-Cauchy
Fresnicourt-le-Dolmen
Gauchin-Légal
Hermin
Houdain
Maisnil-lès-Ruitz
Rebreuve-Ranchicourt

References

Bruay-la-Buissiere